Leslie Brown was a Scottish football player during the late 1950s and early 1960s. He started his career with junior side Kirkintilloch Rob Roy before signing 'senior' with Dumbarton. Here he played with distinction, being a constant in the Dumbarton attack for over four seasons.

References 

Scottish footballers
Dumbarton F.C. players
Scottish Football League players
Living people
Year of birth missing (living people)
Association football forwards
Kirkintilloch Rob Roy F.C. players